A Byzantine-Mongol Alliance occurred during the end of the 13th and the beginning of the 14th century between the Byzantine Empire and the Mongol Empire. Byzantium actually tried to maintain friendly relations with both the Golden Horde and the Ilkhanate realms, who were often at war with each other. The alliance involved numerous exchanges of presents, military collaboration and marital links, but dissolved in the middle of the 14th century.

Diplomatic overtures
Soon after the Battle of Köse Dağ in 1243, the Empire of Trebizond surrendered to the Mongol Empire while the court of Nicaea put its fortresses in order. In the early 1250s, the Latin emperor of Constantinople Baldwin II sent an embassy to Mongolia in the person of the knight Baudoin de Hainaut, who, following his return, met in Constantinople with the departing William of Rubruck.
William of Rubruck also noted that he met an envoy of John III Doukas Vatatzes, Emperor of Nicaea, at the court of Möngke Khan in circa 1253.

Alliance under Michael VIII (1263–1282)
Emperor Michael VIII Palaiologos, after re-establishing Byzantine Imperial rule, established an alliance with the Mongols, who themselves were highly favourable to Christianity, as a minority of them were Nestorian Christians.

He signed a treaty in 1266 with the Mongol Khan of the Kipchak (the Golden Horde), and he married two of his daughters (conceived through a mistress, a Diplovatatzina) to Mongol kings: Euphrosyne Palaiologina, who married Nogai Khan of the Golden Horde, and Maria Palaiologina, who married Abaqa Khan of Ilkhanid Persia.

According to a 1267 letter by Pope Clement IV from Viterbo, Abaqa had agreed to combine forces with his father-in-law Michael VIII to help the Latins in the Holy Land, in preparation for the Eighth Crusade (the second of Louis IX):

In 1265, Berke Khan sent the Golden Horde army under Nogai to Thrace, prompting to force the Byzantines to release the Mamluk envoy and the former Seljuk Sultan Kaykaus II. According to Egyptian sources, Michael agreed to send fabrics to the Mongol Khan in Russia. When Michael realized the importance of the Mongols and became an ally of Noghai, he used his help to defend himself against Bulgaria when it tried to attack the Byzantine Empire in 1273 and 1279. A group of 4,000 Mongol soldiers were dispatched to Constantinople in 1282, just before the death of Michael, to fight against the despot of Thessaly.

Alliance under Andronikos II (1282–1328)
After 1295, Andronikos II offered Ghazan a marital alliance, in exchange for Mongol help to fight against the Turcomans at the Oriental frontier of the Byzantine Empire. Ghazan accepted the offer and promised to stop the incursions. The death of Ghazan in 1304 was mourned by the Byzantines.

This alliance would continue under Ghazan's successor, Oljeitu. In 1305, Ilkhan Oljeitu promised Andronikos II 40,000 men, and in 1308 dispatched 30,000 men to recover many Byzantine towns in Bithynia. Andronicus II gave daughters in marriage to Toqta, as well as his successor Uzbek (1312–1341), but relations turned sour at the end of Andronikos's reign and the Mongols mounted raids on Thrace between 1320 and 1324, until the Byzantine port of Vicina Macaria was occupied by the Mongols.

End of friendly relations
Under Andronikos III relations seem to have turned even more conflictual. In 1341, the Mongols planned to attack Constantinople, and Andronikos III had to send an embassy to stop the attack.

See also
Mongol invasions of Anatolia

Notes

Citations

Sources 
 
 Heath, Ian and McBride, Angus. Byzantine Armies: AD 1118–1461. Osprey Publishing, 1995, .
 
 
 Cheynet, Jean-Claude and Vannier, Jean-François. "Les premiers Paléologues". Etudes prosopographiques. Publications de la Sorbonne, 1986, .
 Richard, Jean. Histoire des Croisades [History of the Crusades]. Paris: Editions Fayard, 1996.
 
 Luisetto, Frédéric. Arméniens & autres Chrétiens d'Orient sous la domination Mongole (in French). Librairie Orientaliste Paul Geuthner S.A., 2007, .
 
 Canal, Denis-Armand and Runciman, Steven. Histoire des Croisades [History of the Crusades]. Editions Dagorno, 1998, .

13th century in the Byzantine Empire
14th century in the Byzantine Empire
Eighth Crusade
Military history of the Mongol Empire
Palaiologos dynasty
13th-century military alliances
14th-century military alliances
Foreign relations of the Byzantine Empire